Steve Hertz may refer to:
 Steve Hertz (baseball coach) (born 1950), former head baseball coach of the UC Irvine Anteaters and Gonzaga Bulldogs
 Steve Hertz (third baseman) (born 1945), former Major League Baseball player